Rome–Ciampino International Airport "G. B. Pastine" , is the secondary international airport of Rome, the capital of Italy, after Rome-Fiumicino Airport "Leonardo da Vinci".

The airport is an important hub for many low-cost carriers and general aviation traffic. It also hosts a military airport and the headquarters of the 31º Stormo and the 2nd Reparto Genio of the Italian Air Force. The airport is named after Giovan Battista Pastine, an Italian airship pilot who served in World War I.

History
Ciampino Airport was opened in 1916 and is one of the oldest airports still in operation.

From here, on 10 April 1926, Umberto Nobile took off on the airship Norge, the first aircraft to reach the North Pole and the first to fly across the polar ice cap from Europe to America. In October 1930, the first helicopter prototype designed by Corradino D'Ascanio was tested at Ciampino Airport, reaching a record altitude of 18 m, 8m45s duration and 1,078 m distance flown.

During World War II, the airport was captured by Allied forces in June 1944, and afterward became a United States Army Air Forces military airfield. Although primarily used as a transport base by C-47 Skytrain aircraft of the 64th Troop Carrier Group, the Twelfth Air Force 86th Bombardment Group flew A-36 Apache combat aircraft from the airport during the immediate period after its capture from German forces.

When the combat units moved out, Air Transport Command used the airport as a major transshipment hub for cargo, transiting aircraft and personnel for the remainder of the war.

It was Rome's main airport until 1960, with traffic amounting to over 2 million passengers per year. After the opening of Leonardo da Vinci–Fiumicino Airport, Ciampino handled almost exclusively charter and executive flights for more than three decades. However, the terminal facilities were extended at the beginning of 2007 to accommodate the growing number of low-cost carrier operations.

Facilities

Passenger terminal
The airport features a single, one-story passenger terminal building containing the departures and arrivals facilities. The departures area consists of a main hall with some stores and service facilities as well as 31 check-in counters and 16 departure gates using walk or bus boarding as there are no jet-bridges. The arrivals area has a separate entrance and features four baggage belts as well as some more service counters.

Other usage
The airport hosts a fleet of Bombardier 415 aerial firefighting aircraft. It is also used by express logistics companies such as DHL, by official flights of the Italian Government and by planes of dignitaries visiting the Italian capital. There is also an additional smaller general aviation terminal, although private flights have now mainly been transferred to Rome Urbe Airport.

Airlines and destinations

The following airlines operate regular scheduled and charter flights to and from Ciampino Airport:

Statistics
After decades of stagnation in scheduled traffic, low-cost carriers have boosted Ciampino; it is now one of the busiest and fastest growing airports in Italy. Passenger traffic in 2007 was 5,402,000 (9.24% up from 2006; 2006 itself had seen an increase of 16.75% compared to 2005). Traffic has grown so much that noise complaints are now forcing the Italian Ministry of Transport to look for a third airport for Rome, which could take over some part of the excess traffic of Ciampino. Passenger traffic in 2008 was 4,788,931 with a decrease of 11.31% compared to 2007 due to economic crisis and EasyJet gradually moving routes to Leonardo da Vinci–Fiumicino Airport. In 2014, passenger traffic amounted to 5,018,289, and in 2015 the airport handled 5,834,201 passengers.

Ground transportation

Airlink 
Italian train company Trenitalia operates a service called Airlink connecting the airport and the Roma Termini railway station via a combination of bus and train.

Taxi 
Taxis licensed by the City of Rome have a fixed tariff for the single journey between Ciampino Airport and the area of the City of Rome within the Aurelian Walls (historical central Rome). The current tariff is 30 euros (plus luggage supplement of 1 euro for the second and subsequent pieces of luggage).

Train 
While there is no train service at the airport itself, there are a variety of bus connections between the airport and stations of the Italian mainline railway network or stations of the Rome city metro (subway, tube, underground) system. The different bus or bus + train options are relatively inexpensive, usually under 6 euros for a single journey.

ATAC city bus services 
The ATAC Rome city bus line 720 connects the terminal building with the Laurentina metro (subway, tube, underground) station (departures every 15 minutes in either direction from 5.30 am to 23.20 pm, travel time is about 15–20 minutes).
The ATAC Rome city bus line 520 connects the terminal building with the Cinecittà metro (subway, tube, underground) station (departures every 15 minutes in either direction,  from 5.30 am to 23.20 pm, travel time is about 15–20 minutes). 
Both these routes are included in the normal ticket arrangements current for city public transport in Rome, where one Metro train journey costs a single BIT ("biglietto integrato" = "integrated ticket") ticket, while a single journey on either of the named ATAC bus lines (720 or 520) between Ciampino airport and one of the named Rome Metro stations (Laurentina or Anagnina) also costs a single BIT ("integrated ticket") ticket. This means that it is possible to travel between any station in the Rome metro system and Ciampino airport for a total cost (at current rates) of 3 euros (2 BIT tickets per person). Obviously, residents can also use personalized subscription passes. The BIT tickets need to be purchased before boarding the bus and time-stamped by one of the ticket machines inside the bus. The ATAC bus stop for these services is located 2–3 minutes walk from the main airport buildings.

ATRAL bus services 
There are ATRAL bus services (www.atral-lazio.com) connecting the airport to the Anagnina metro (subway, tube, underground) station or to the local Ciampino mainline railway station. The Ciampino railway station is served by trains travelling both to Rome Termini station and to other mainline rail destinations, including Frosinone, Albano Laziale and Potenza). The bus to the  Ciampino railway station leaves the airport on weekdays between 5.46 am and 11.20 pm at intervals of between 5 and 55 minutes, with a journey time of 10 minutes. The bus to the Anagnina metro station leaves the airport on weekdays between 6.15 am and 10.40 pm at intervals of between 26 and 75  minutes, with a journey time of 20 minutes. Festive day timetables are partly reduced.

Direct Bus Services to Central Rome

Bus operators  Schiaffini, Terravision and BusShuttle
The Rome Airport Bus service of the Schiaffini company has services to and from Ciampino airport, the town of Ciampino  and the central Roma Termini mainline railway station. Tickets can be purchased at the company's sales point in the Ciampino airport building, on board the bus, or online (www.romeairportbus.com), or at the bus stop in Via Giolitti, Rome (alongside the Termini railway station). (departures every 30 minutes in either direction between 7.50 am and 10 pm with some extra departures from 4 am to 11.45 pm; travel time is about 40 minutes)
A similar service is operated  by  Terravision (departures from Ciampino airport at intervals of approx. 40–70 minutes between 8.15 am and 16.30 pm) Tickets can be purchased online (www.terravision.eu/rome_ciampino.html), also by   BusShuttle (departures from Ciampino airport at intervals of approx. 30–120 minutes between 7.45 am and midnight) Tickets can be purchased online (www.sitbusshuttle.com).

Transport between Ciampino and Fiumicino Airports
There are only two ways, other than by private car, of travelling between the two airports. One is to take a taxi, which has a fixed tariff (currently 50 euros). The other is to travel to Rome's Termini station and from there to travel out to the required airport.

Foot 
The Appian Way can be reached on foot in 10 minutes (750 m) from the terminal building. This ancient Roman road is a popular walking route. 11 km north-west along this road one reaches the start of the road at the Porta San Sebastiano, 3 km south-east along this road one reaches the train station of Santa Maria delle Mole.

Accidents and incidents
 Defects in the design of the de Havilland Comet jet airliner were discovered as the result of inflight breakups on two Comets that departed from Ciampino:
 On 10 January 1954, BOAC Flight 781, a de Havilland Comet, broke up in mid air and crashed into the Mediterranean twenty minutes after takeoff from Ciampino Airport, en route to London Heathrow Airport.
 On 8 April 1954, two weeks after Comets were allowed to resume flying following a temporary grounding resulting from the previous crash, South African Airways Flight 201, another Comet, broke up shortly after takeoff and crashed not far from Ponza.
 On 21 December 1959, Vickers Viscount I-LIZT of Alitalia crashed short of the runway on a training flight exercise in landing with two engines inoperative. Both people on board were killed.
 On 10 November 2008, Ryanair Flight 4102 from Hahn suffered damage during landing. The cause of the accident was stated to be birdstrikes affecting both engines. The port undercarriage of the Boeing 737-8AS collapsed. The aircraft involved was Boeing 737-8AS EI-DYG, delivered new to Ryanair from Boeing. There were 6 crew and 166 passengers on board. The airport was closed for over 24 hours as a result of the accident. Two crew and eight passengers were taken to hospital with minor injuries. As well as damage to the engines and undercarriage, the rear fuselage was also damaged by contact with the runway. The final report of the accident, investigated by ANSV (National Agency for the Safety of Flights) was released on 20 December 2018, more than 10 years after the accident.

References

External links

 
 
 

1916 establishments in Italy
Airports in Italy
Airports in Rome
Buildings and structures in Lazio
Airfields of the United States Army Air Forces Air Transport Command in the European Theater
Airfields of the United States Army Air Forces in Italy
Airports established in 1916